Antonio Ray Dawson (born August 25, 1967) is a retired American professional basketball player. At a height of 6'7" (2.01 m) tall,  and a weight of 220 lb. (100 kg), he played at the small forward position.

High school
Dawson was born in Kinston, North Carolina, and he attended Kinston High School.

College career
Dawson played college basketball at Gulf Coast Community College, and at Florida State University, with the Florida State Seminoles.

Professional career
Dawson played a handful of NBA games during the 1990s. Dawson was signed to a 10-day contract by the Sacramento Kings on March 7, 1991. He played in 4 NBA games with them, averaging 2.3 points and 0.5 rebounds per game.

On January 25, 1995, as a member of the CBA's Rockford Lightning, he was named the Most Valuable Player of the CBA All-Star Game, which was held at Hartford Civic Center, in Hartford, Connecticut, after he scored 26 points.

He was signed to a 10-day contract by the Boston Celtics on March 28, 1995, but he did not play in an NBA game for them. He was signed to a second contract on April 7, and then played in 2 NBA games for them, averaging four points and 1.5 rebounds per game. Dawson also played professionally in Spain, Israel, France, Germany, Greece, Lebanon, and Venezuela.

Personal life
Dawson is the older brother of NBA player Jerry Stackhouse, and the uncle of former Wake Forest University guard Craig Dawson.

References

External links

FIBA Europe Profile
Spanish League Archive Profile 
Italian League Profile 

1967 births
Living people
American expatriate basketball people in France
American expatriate basketball people in Germany
American expatriate basketball people in Greece
American expatriate basketball people in Israel
American expatriate basketball people in Italy
American expatriate basketball people in Lebanon
American expatriate basketball people in Spain
American expatriate basketball people in Venezuela
American men's basketball players
Apollon Patras B.C. players
Basketball players from North Carolina
Bayer Giants Leverkusen players
Boston Celtics players
Cholet Basket players
Cocodrilos de Caracas players
Dafnis B.C. players
Florida State Seminoles men's basketball players
Greek Basket League players
Gulf Coast State College alumni
Ionikos N.F. B.C. players
Joventut Badalona players
Junior college men's basketball players in the United States
Liga ACB players
Pensacola Tornados (1986–1991) players
People from Kinston, North Carolina
Sacramento Kings players
Small forwards
Tenerife AB players
Undrafted National Basketball Association players
Victoria Libertas Pallacanestro players
Al Riyadi Club Beirut basketball players